Fereshteh Khosroujerdy is a visually impaired Iranian singer. Born visually impaired, she fled Iran and lived in the UK in 2007 after experiencing domestic abuse at the hands of her husband.

She was named one of BBC's 100 Women in 2013.

References 

Year of birth missing (living people)
Living people
BBC 100 Women
21st-century Iranian women singers
Iranian emigrants to the United Kingdom